The Vukovar Film Festival is an annual film festival established in 2007 and held in the town of Vukovar, Croatia. It usually takes place over five or six days in late August.

Overview
Festival is dedicated to films made in Danube region and neighbouring countries – Austria, Bosnia and Herzegovina, Bulgaria, Montenegro, Czech Republic, Greece, Croatia, Hungary, Moldavia, Germany, Romania, Slovakia, Serbia and Ukraine. It was founded by Igor Rakonić. Screenings were usually held on a barge located in Danube river, but from 8th edition moved to newly opened CineStar movie theater and several other locations in the town. Some screenings are also held in Vinkovci and Valpovo.

Awards
The main award at the festival is called Zlatni šlep.

In 2014, an award for lifetime achievement was introduced, given to notable filmmakers. Its first recipient was Mustafa Nadarević.

Award winners

Golden Barge Award for Best Feature Film

Golden Barge Award for Best Short Film

Golden Barge Award for Best Documentary Film

References

External links
Vukovar Film Festival at Croatian Audiovisual Centre

Film festivals in Croatia
Film festivals established in 2007
2007 establishments in Croatia
Vukovar
Summer events in Croatia